Preflagellin peptidase (FlaK) is an enzyme that catalyses the following chemical reaction:

 Cleaves the signal peptide of 3 to 12 amino acids from the N-terminal of preflagellin, usually at Arg-Gly- or Lys-Gly-, to release flagellin.

This aspartic peptidase is present in Archaea.

References

External links 
 

EC 3.4.23